Abdopus is a genus of octopuses in the family Octopodidae.

Species
 Abdopus abaculus (Norman & Sweeney, 1997) – mosaic octopus
 Abdopus aculeatus (d'Orbigny, 1834) – algae octopus
 Abdopus capricornicus (Norman & Finn, 2001)
 Abdopus horridus (d'Orbigny, 1826) – Red Sea octopus
 Abdopus tenebricus (Smith, 1884)
 Abdopus tonganus  (Hoyle, 1885)
 Abdopus undulatus Huffard, 2007 
Taxon inquirendum
 Abdopus guangdongensis (Dong, 1976)

References

 Norman M.D. & Hochberg F.G. (2005) The current state of Octopus taxonomy. Phuket Marine Biological Center Research Bulletin 66:127–154.
 Huffard, C.L., R.L. Caldwell & F. Boneka. 2008. Mating behavior of Abdopus aculeatus  (d’Orbigny 1834) (Cephalopoda: Octopodidae) in the wild. Marine Biology (published online first).

External links

 

Octopodidae
Cephalopod genera